Pembury Cutting and Pit is a  geological Site of Special Scientific Interest east of Tunbridge Wells in Kent. It is a Geological Conservation Review site.

This site exposes rocks of the Tunbridge Wells Sand Formation, dating to the Early Cretaceous around 140 to 100 million years ago. There are many fossils of Lycopodites, an extinct plant.

This site is in three separate areas, and a lane and a footpath run along the side of two of them.

References

Sites of Special Scientific Interest in Kent
Geological Conservation Review sites